The February 14–15, 2015 North American blizzard was a potent blizzard occurred in the Northeast United States. The storm system also brought some of the most coldest temperatures to the Northeast in its wake. The Blizzard was Dubbed Winter Storm Neptune by the Weather Channel.

Meteorological history 

The storm developed in a similar fashion to how the previous blizzard originated. On February 14, a clipper system moved off the East Coast and began to intensify rapidly. By midnight, it had gained most of the required criteria to meet blizzard conditions in eastern New England. The storm was then absorbed by another cyclone on February 17.

Aftermath and cold wave 

The associated cold wave brought the coldest air recorded over portions of the eastern Great Lakes in decades on February 15, and possibly over the entire forecast record. Well below normal temperatures covered a large portion of the eastern United States and were expected to stay in place, with only slight moderation, through the rest of the month. Through February 21, primarily on February 16 and February 20, over 600 record low temperatures were recorded in the eastern U.S., including all-time record lows and record lows for February, including the entire state of Kentucky tying the statewide monthly record low. As of February 15, Lake Erie had 94 percent ice cover while Lake Superior and Lake Huron were over 80 percent covered, and Lakes Michigan and Ontario were between 50 and 60 percent iced over.

After the storm, Great Smoky Mountains National Park closed.

Snowfall reports 

This is a list of the largest snowfall reports by state impacted by the storm.

 Massachusetts
  in Acushnet and Ipswich

 Maine
  near Robbinston

Connecticut
  in Staffordville

Maryland
  in Oakland

Michigan
  near Zeeland

New Hampshire
  near Seabrook

New Jersey
  in Red Bank

New York
  in Cape Vincent

Ohio
  in Shaker Heights

Pennsylvania
  in Chandlers Valley

Rhode Island
  in Warren

Vermont
  in Woodford

West Virginia
  in Quinwood

See also 

January 2015 North American blizzard
2014-15 North American winter

References 

2015,02
2014–15 North American winter
Cold waves in the United States
Cold waves in Canada
February 2015 events in the United States
2015 natural disasters in the United States
2015 disasters in Canada
2015 cold waves
Natural disasters in Maine